International Humanitarian City (IHC) is a Dubai, United Arab Emirates, based global hub for humanitarian emergency preparedness and response, which positions itself as the world's largest aid hub. Founded in 2003 by the Ruler of Dubai, Mohammed bin Rashid Al Maktoum, it is a major logistics centre for the international distribution of humanitarian aid and relief, with over 130,000 square metres of warehousing and logistical support facilities. IHC is a UAE free zone and is near Dubai Industrial City to the southwest.

Global aid
IHC hosts nine United Nations agencies and more than 85 NGOs and commercial entities engaged in delivering aid both in humanitarian crises and to support long-term economic development. It is home to UNHCR's global stockpile of humanitarian aid.

IHC is one of three organisations, together with Emirates and DP World, behind the Vaccine Logistics Alliance, which supports the World Health Organization's (WHO) COVAX initiative and its efforts to distribute two billion doses of COVID-19 vaccines in 2021. As of July 2021, 150 million doses had been distributed to 80 global destinations from IHC via Emirates.

Logistics hub
IHC members have procured and shipped aid from the IHC hub to cope with the ongoing civil conflicts in Syria and Afghanistan, flood recovery and educational projects in Pakistan, and recurring drought in East Africa as well as COVID-19 related assistance to Africa. A key shipment of aid was made from the UN hub at IHC to Lebanon, when 20 tonnes of aid was sent in a flight donated by the United Arab Emirates for relief following the 2020 Beirut port blast, one of three shipments supported by the World Health Organization (WHO) and International Red Cross. In 2014, a total of 21 airlifts took place from IHC to assist the Palestinian population of Gaza, funded by Mohammed bin Rashid and supported by UNRWA.

International Humanitarian City operates under the umbrella of the Mohammed Bin Rashid Al Maktoum Global Initiatives (MBRGI).

Chief Executive Officer of IHC 
 2005–2007: Walid Hareb Al Falahi
 2009–2011: Makiya Al Hajiri
 2011–2016: Shaima Al Zarooni
 since 2017: Giuseppe Saba

See also
 Dubai Industrial City

References

External links
 IHC official website
 UN Project Supplies

2003 establishments in the United Arab Emirates
Economy of Dubai
Geography of Dubai
Free-trade zones of the United Arab Emirates
Humanitarian aid
United Nations